Mael Kaudre is a footballer who played attack for the New Caledonia national football team. He scored a goal against the Fiji national football team in Ba, Fiji during the Oceania world cup qualifier. He also played in the 2008 OFC Nations Cup.

He played attack for Noumea-based A.S. Magenta, in the New Caledonia Division Honneur league, from 2006 through 2009.

References

Year of birth missing (living people)
Living people
New Caledonian footballers
AS Magenta players
Association football forwards
New Caledonia international footballers
2008 OFC Nations Cup players